A jeremiad is a long literary work, usually in prose, but sometimes in verse, in which the author bitterly laments the state of society and its morals in a serious tone of sustained invective, and always contains a prophecy of society's imminent downfall.

Generally, the term jeremiad is applied to moralistic texts that denounce a society for its wickedness, and prophesy its downfall. Over time, the impact of the term has faded and has become a general expression for lament. It is often perceived with derogatory overtones.

The jeremiad has a unique presence in American culture and in the history of the United States, having roots in Colonial-era settlers in New England. In American culture, jeremiads are closely associated with historical American Puritans and the controversial concept of American exceptionalism.

Origins and usage
The word is named after the biblical prophet Jeremiah, and comes from biblical works attributed to him, the Book of Jeremiah and the Book of Lamentations.  The Book of Jeremiah prophesies the coming downfall of the Kingdom of Judah, and asserts that this is because its rulers have broken the covenant with the Lord.

The Lamentations, similarly, lament the fall of the kingdom of Judah after the conquest prophesied by Jeremiah has occurred:

How doth the city sit solitary, that was full of people! how is she become as a widow! she that was great among the nations, and princess among the provinces, how is she become tributary!

She weepeth sore in the night, and her tears are on her cheeks: among all her lovers she hath none to comfort her: all her friends have dealt treacherously with her, they are become her enemies.

Judah is gone into captivity because of affliction, and because of great servitude: she dwelleth among the heathen, she findeth no rest: all her persecutors overtook her between the straits.

The ways of Zion do mourn, because none come to the solemn feasts: all her gates are desolate: her priests sigh, her virgins are afflicted, and she is in bitterness.

The American Heritage Dictionary of the English Language defines Jeremiad as: "a literary work or speech expressing a bitter lament or a righteous prophecy of doom". As well as being form of Lamentation; an utterance of grief or sorrow; a complaining tirade: used with a spice of ridicule or mockery, implying either that the grief itself is unnecessarily great, or that the utterance of it is tediously drawn out and attended with a certain satisfaction to the utterer. Third definition is "a tale of sorrow, disappointment, or complaint; a doleful story; a dolorous tirade; - generally used satirically." Merriam-Webster dictionary defines Jeremiad as "a prolonged lamentation or complaint also : a cautionary or angry harangue.

The use of jeremiad in American culture 

The Puritans of New England emigrated to Americas with the intention of building a "City upon a Hill" in America, which was to be a model above all for England. This theme, related to the Sermon on the Mount, goes back to the governor of the first New England colony, John Winthrop. Even the second generation of Puritans was accused in the sermons of that time of no longer fulfilling the required role model function. Among other things, moral violations were cited as evidence. The sermons then increasingly portrayed the wrath of God at the transgressions of the New Englanders; Bad harvests and Indian wars were interpreted as harbingers of the impending Last Judgment. The American jeremiad thus became a reflection of social tendencies with the aim of pointing out and correcting undesirable developments and pursuing the ideal of the "Holy Commonwealth", which the Puritans had striven for.

The jeremiad was a favourite literary device of the Puritans, and was used in prominent early evangelical sermons like "Sinners in the Hands of an Angry God" by Jonathan Edwards. Besides Jonathan Edwards, such jeremiads can be found in every era of American history, including John Adams, Thomas Jefferson and James Fenimore Cooper. The Jeremiad shows a self-image as a religiously motivated economic and political experiment being under constant threat.

The term has also found use in American literature, since the expectation of parousia, which has been linked to America since the Puritans, increasingly appears to many writers as an illusion in view of the social reality. Works by Norman Mailer (The Armies of the Night), Thomas Pynchon (The Crying of Lot 49), Nathanael West (The Day of the Locust) and Hubert Selby (Last Exit to Brooklyn) were interpreted as jeremiads, as were older works of American literature such as Herman Melville's The Confidence-Man or William Faulkner's Southern literature.

Authors from Gildas to Robert Bork have had this label hung on their works. Extending that tradition in a reflective vein is the autobiographical work of freed American slave Frederick Douglass, who lamented the moral corruption that slavery wrought on America – from both a Jeffersonian and Christian tradition.

Role in American politics

According to the Canadian literary scholar Sacvan Bercovitch, in a typical American jeremiad, the biblical promise of a perfect society contradicts the actual mistakes of American society The Jeremiad thus has the function of a social corrective in that it links salvation to the righteous behavior of Americans. Bercovitch found this pattern in many political speeches, especially by conservative speakers (see Manifest Destiny). In his foreword to the 2012 new edition of his book also sees the Jeremiad as part of the discourse of the American left.

The role of America as a myth and concept of salvation is an important part of the political rhetoric of the United States and is described, among other things, in inaugural speeches. America is described as a world and salvation history experiment with a role model character, as a vision and also cited self-accusatory and apocalyptic tones. It corresponds to a civil religious tradition of rhetorical millennialism. The Yes we can motto utilized by the 44th President of the USA, Barack Obama, is also placed in this context. The disputes over sectarian remarks by his former preacher Jeremiah Wright, which questioned Obama's success in the election campaign, were discussed as a double jeremiad, so to speak, Obama's answer, "A More Perfect Union" is also in tradition and was the turning point of the campaign.

See also
 Philippic (tirade, orations)

References

Further reading

External links
Forms of American Puritan Rhetoric: The Jeremiad

Rhetoric
Genres of poetry
Jeremiah